Nicolaas (Nico) Verlaan (born 12 August 1932, Amsterdam) is a Dutch former politician of the Farmers' Party (Boerenpartij).

Verlaan was an MP from 1967 to 1971. He was also a member of the municipal council of Amsterdam and a member of the provincial parliament of North Holland.

References 
  Parlement.com biography

1932 births
Living people
Businesspeople from Amsterdam
Farmers' Party (Netherlands) politicians
Members of the House of Representatives (Netherlands)
Members of the Provincial Council of North Holland
Municipal councillors of Amsterdam